The title keeper of the seals or equivalent is used in several contexts, denoting the person entitled to keep and authorize use of the great seal of a given country. The title may or may not be linked to a particular cabinet or ministerial office.  This is most often the case today, but in the past the role was often a distinct and important job.

Canada

The official Keeper of the Great Seal of Canada is the Governor General. At his or her installation, the governor general swears three oaths, one of which is the oath of the office of keeper of the great seal. The seal is also presented to the Governor General who entrusts it back to the registrar general for safekeeping. The seal is actually kept with the Registrar General of Canada, a title which since 1995 has been linked to the office of Minister of Industry.

Each province since 1869 has its own seal and their keepers are the provincial Lieutenant Governors. As the Registrar General actually keeps the Great seal of Canada, so the provincial Great Seals are placed by the lieutenant-governors of the provinces into the keeping of the provincial Attorneys-General.

France

The French "Keeper of the Seals" (Garde des Sceaux) is a title held by the Minister of Justice. Formerly, as Keeper of the Seals of France, this title belonged to the Chancellor, the ancien régime counterpart of the minister of justice. The title is nowadays often used interchangeably with "Minister of Justice of France."

The Minister of Justice guards the Great Seal of France, dating from 1848, in his or her office, as well as the stamping press. The Seal was used in 1958 to seal the Constitution of France and has since been used to seal certain constitutional amendments.

Italy
In Italy, the Minister of Justice  assumes the duties of Guardasigilli (Keeper of the Seals).

As Guardasigilli, the Minister of Justice countersigns all laws and decrees signed by the president and the decrees issued by other ministries. The Minister of Justice is also the editor of the Gazzetta Ufficiale della Repubblica Italiana, the official bulletin of the Italian Republic.

Japan
 

The Lord Keeper of the Privy Seal of Japan (内大臣, Naidaijin) was an administrative post not of Cabinet rank in the government of the Empire of Japan, responsible for keeping the Privy Seal of Japan and State Seal of Japan.

Malaysia

Netherlands
In the Netherlands, custody of the great seal is held ex-officio by the Minister of Justice.

New Zealand
The Governor-General of New Zealand has custody of the Seal of New Zealand. However, responsibility for the seal is delegated to the Clerk of the Executive Council. The seal is affixed to various instruments that require it.

Papacy
In medieval and Renaissance times the Papal Custode del Piombo ("Keeper of the Lead") was an important and well-paid office, always held by a friar. The painter Sebastiano del Piombo held it from 1531 until his death in 1546, and the nickname he is known by came from his job-title.  He had to take holy orders for the purpose, despite having a wife and two sons.  The position was usually awarded for life, and in the Renaissance was often given to artists who worked on papal projects.  The important architect Bramante had been appointed in 1513, but died the next year, when Mariano Fetti succeeded. He was already a friar, and a sort of court jester, but also an intimate friend to the Medici Pope Leo X.  He held the role under three popes until his death in 1531, when Sebastiano succeeded him.

United Kingdom

Several British officials have titles connected to the keeping of seals.

United States

The United States Secretary of State is the official keeper of the Great Seal of the United States, and the seal may only be affixed to instruments as provided by law or by authorization of the President. The authority to manage the operation of the device is delegated to an official at the State Department. This official is the Director of the Office of Presidential Appointments, the office that manages the Great Seal at the Department of State. Informally, the director is sometimes referred to as the “Keeper” in the sense that the job has been delegated.

Unlike the Great Seals listed above, the Great Seal of the United States is the primary graphical emblem of the United States and is used equivalently to a coat of arms.

The seals of individual U.S. states are typically the responsibility of the State Secretary of State.

References

Government occupations
Legal professions
Government of France
Court titles
Medieval titles